Sadiqi Beg, also referred to as Sadiqi Beg Afshar (1533 Tabriz–1610 Isfahan), was a Persian painter, poet, biographer, draftsman, soldier and miniaturist of the Safavid period. He served as the head of the Royal Library serving under Shah Abbas I, and is most known for artistic reform.

Biography
Sadiqi Beg was born in Tabriz, the capital of the Safavid dynasty, into the Khudabandalu Turkmen tribe in 940/1533. He came from a lineage of Turkish soldiers that migrated Syria to support Shah Isma'il, who founded the Safavid dynasty. Although his family settled in Tabriz, his father was killed early in life, and Sadiqi Beg moved around Safavid as a dervish. At the age of 32, he gave up life as a dervish and studied art and the treatise of the science of poetry under the instruction of poet and calligrapher Mir San‛i for 3 years. In 1568, he asked his pupil and nephew Muzfatar Ali, reputedly an incomparable figure painter, to teach him the art of the well-known earlier artist Bihzad.

Eventually, he served in the royal staff of Shah Isma'il II, who ruled from 1576 to 1577. While Sultan Mohammad Khuadbanda was in power from 1577-1587, he served as a member of the Afshar tribe and fought in the Battle of Astarabad. Later, he lived in Hamadan, Lahijan and Yazd. Upon the rise to power of Shah Abbas I in 1587, Sadiqi was bestowed as the head of the royal library in Qazwin. Even though he had high royal favorability, he had conflicts with his colleagues. Thus, in 1598, he fell from office, but retained his official title and salary. Despite not being the active librarian, he continued to influence the decisions of Shah Abbas I as it relates to his successor and the work that he commissioned.   

Sadiqi's native language was Chaghatai, and he wrote biographical sketches of some of the era's leading poets, artists and connoisseurs in that language. His work is inspired by Turkish poets Ali-Shir Nava’i, Baki, and Fuzuli. In addition to Changtai, he knew 2 other turkish literary languages. He wrote the Tazkhireh-i Majma‘ al-Khavas (lives of artists), which includes biographies of 350 poets and samples of their work, and is inspired by Ali-Shir Nava'i’s Majalis un-Nafais, another tazkhireh. The Tazkhireh-i Majma‘ al-Khavas has 8 sections including those on contemporary rulers, Turkish Statesmen, and Persian Poets.

He also wrote the famous Qanun as-Suwar (Canons of Painting) between 1576 and 1602, a treatise on painting techniques in Persian verse. He reportedly "painted thousands of marvellous portraits". His writings are one of the major sources on the history of Persian miniature painting because it details style and instruction for making art. His Persian writing style was inspired by classic Persian artists, including Khaqani, Ẓahīr, Kamal od-Din Esmail, and Saadi Shirazi. He used classical style, and critiqued contemporary styles. Unique to this time, historians point out that he avoided politics by abstaining from using religious denominations to refer to different techniques in his art. 

Examples of Sadiqi's work are in a number of museums. A 3-inch by 6-inch (7.62 cm by 15.24 cm) gouache miniature on gold paper, Portrait d'une jeune femme assise sur un rocher, attributed to Sadiqi from 1590, sold at auction in Paris in 1996 for 80,000 French francs (15,792 U.S. dollars; 12,604 euros; or 10,301 British pounds). Some scholars, such as B. W. Robinson, attribute the 107 miniatures in a 1593 version of Anwar i-Suhayli (a book of fables) to Sadiqi, although others, such as Basil Gray, think that they appear to be by several artists, not all of the same quality. It is also possible that he commissioned this work with his personal wealth. The manuscript, in the collection of the Marquess of Bute, is inscribed to "Sadiqi Beg, the rarity of the age, the second Mani, the Bihzad of the time".

Safavid historian Iskandar Beg Munshi writes: “The paintings of the royal palace [in Qazvin], and of the royal assembly in the Čhehel Sotūn hall [completed ca. 1556], were drawn by him, and most of the painting was also his work."

His last royal work was on an edition of the Shahnameh (Book of Kings), part of which is at the Chester Beatty Library in Dublin.

References 

1533 births
1610 deaths
16th-century Iranian painters
17th-century Iranian painters
Iranian librarians
Poets from Tabriz
16th-century Persian-language poets
Persian miniature painters
Ethnic Afshar people